Pove del Grappa is a town in the province of Vicenza, Veneto, Italy. It is east of SS47.

Maïmouna Guerresi a photographer, sculptor, video and installation artist was born here in 1951.

References

External links
 (Google Maps)

Cities and towns in Veneto